Zica may refer to :

 Žiča, an early 13th-century Serb Orthodox monastery near Kraljevo, Serbia
 Zica Manuhi (born 1993), a Vanuatuan football player
 Zica family, a historic Brazilian family, originating in Minas Gerais in the late 18th century
 Zica, Africa, Ancient city and former bishopric in Roman Africa, probably in present Tunisian city of Zaghouan; now a Latin Catholic titular bishopric

ZICA may refer to:
 Zambia Institute of Chartered Accountants, a member of the International Federation of Accountants (IFAC)

See also 
 Zika (disambiguation)